Zita Nancy Lusack (born 4 September 1977 in Aylesbury, Buckinghamshire) is a British female former artistic gymnast.

Gymnastics career
Lusack represented England in five events at the 1994 Commonwealth Games in Victoria, British Columbia, Canada. She won a gold medal in the team event, a silver medal on the beam and a bronze medal in the all-around event.

References

External links
 Zita Lusack at GymnasticsHistory.co.uk
 

1977 births
Living people
British female artistic gymnasts
English female artistic gymnasts
Commonwealth Games medallists in gymnastics
Commonwealth Games gold medallists for England
Commonwealth Games silver medallists for England
Commonwealth Games bronze medallists for England
Gymnasts at the 1994 Commonwealth Games
Medallists at the 1994 Commonwealth Games